The Montana Cowboy Hall of Fame is a 501(c)(3) hall of fame  organization. Its stated goal is to ""To honor our cowboy way of life, American Indian cultures, and our collective Montana western heritage.  It confers the honour of induction on an annual list of distinguished individuals.  At present, the organization lacks a permanent physical museum, but was granted statutory recognition by the Montana State Legislature in 2003 and 2011.  Fundraising efforts include a specialty car license plate, The hall of fame  was granted US$0.5 million in state funds for site development and project planning during a 2007 special session of the legislature.

A previous proposal was to be located in Wolf Point, Montana, as designated by the State of Montana in 2003. But the Big Timber location was selected in part due to its proximity to Interstate 90, proximity to other tourist destinations such as Yellowstone National Park and lower construction costs.

Inductees

The first round of legacy award inductees was announced on April 8, 2008.  Trustees from the twelve districts voted on the nominees to arrive at 51 foundational members of the hall of fame.  This initial round includes nominees who made their impact on Montana's western heritage between 1860 and 1920.  Subsequent inductees were announced annually thereafter.

District 1 (Daniels, Phillips, Roosevelt, Sheridan, and Valley counties)
Assiniboine people
Sherman T. Cogswell
"Dutch Henry" Ieuch
William H. Moecker
Sitting Bull

District 2 (Dawson, Garfield, McCone, Prairie, Richland, and Wibaux counties)
Evelyn Cameron
Bob Fudge
N Bar N Ranch
Undem Ranch
Ralph Whitlock
XIT Ranch

District 3 (Carter, Custer, Fallon, Powder River, Rosebud, and Treasure counties)
Ord Ames
Casey Barthelmess
T.W. "Wiley" King
Lisle D. Powell
David and Ijkalaka Russell
W.W. Terrett

District 4 (Blaine, Chouteau, Hill, and Liberty counties)
"Long George" Francis
Marie Gibson
Jim McCoy
Honora Matilda Redwing
Winfield Scott Young

District 5 (Cascade, Glacier, Pondera, Teton and Toole counties)
Peggy Bell
Edwin R Freiboth
Charles M. Russell

District 6 (Fergus, Golden Valley, Judith Basin, Musselshell, Petroleum, and Wheatland counties)
E.C. "Teddy Blue" Abbott
James Fergus
DHS Ranch
Granville Stuart
George R. "Two Dot" Wilson

District 7 (Big Horn, Carbon, Stillwater, Sweet Grass and Yellowstone counties)
Plenty Coups
Dilworth Cattle Company
Charles C. Huyck
Charles McDonnell
William Franklin McLeod

District 8 (Broadwater, Jefferson, and Lewis and Clark counties)
2nd US Cavalry
Broadwater Hotel and Natatorium
Thomas Cruse
John M. Frey
General Thomas Francis Meagher
Sons and Daughters of the Montana Pioneers

District 9 (Gallatin, Meagher, and Park counties)
Charles Anceney
Charles M. Bair
Henry Heeb
Nelson Brothers
Nelson Story
Frank Crail
Dick Randall OTO Dude Ranchg

Districts 10, 11, and 12 (Lake, Lincoln, Sanders, Mineral, Missoula, Ravalli, Deer Lodge, Beaverhead, Silver Bow, Granite, Madison and Powell counties)
Myron D. Jeffers
Conrad Kohrs
Nevada City Hotel
Henry Plummer
The Round Barn
Spokane - 1889 Kentucky Derby winner

External links
Montana Cowboy Hall of Fame website

Notes and references

Cowboy halls of fame
State halls of fame in the United States
Halls of fame in Montana
Proposed museums in the United States
Biographical museums in Montana
Museums in Wolf Point, Montana